Tideman Johnson Natural Area is a city park of about  in southeast Portland, in the U.S. state of Oregon. Located at Southeast 37th Avenue and Tenino Street along Johnson Creek, the site is named for a mid-19th century family named Johnson that encouraged public use of its land along the creek. The park has paved and unpaved paths for hiking. A loop trail and boardwalk off the Springwater Corridor runs through the park.

Ecology
A good area for bird-watching, the park attracts owls, pigeons, kingfishers, and herons. In late spring and early summer, Tideman Johnson's big-leaf maples, alders, and other trees are frequented by warblers, grosbeaks and mourning doves. Other birds commonly seen in the park include sapsuckers, woodpeckers, chickadees, and bushtits. During a restoration project completed in 2006, workers identified 22 fish species in the creek at Tideman Johnson and counted 23 Chinook salmon and 107 steelhead trout.

Maintenance
Portland's Bureau of Environmental Services (BES) undertook the 2006 project to repair a sewer line that runs through the park. In 1922, when it was constructed, the Lents Interceptor sewer was buried about  beneath Johnson Creek. Over the years, the stream washed away the fill above the pipe, exposing it to possible damage. Workers surrounded the pipe with concrete during the project and covered it with rock. They also reshaped stream banks, planted 5,300 trees and shrubs, and added boulders and woody debris to the stream to prevent erosion and improve fish habitat.

Notes and references
Notes

References

External links

Johnson Creek Watershed Council

1940 establishments in Oregon
Parks in Portland, Oregon
Protected areas established in 1940
Southeast Portland, Oregon
Urban public parks